The Linnean Medal of the Linnean Society of London was established in 1888, and is awarded annually to alternately a botanist or a zoologist or (as has been common since 1958) to one of each in the same year. The medal was of gold until 1976, and is for the preceding years often referred to as "the Gold Medal of the Linnean Society", not to be confused with the official Linnean Gold Medal which is seldom awarded.

The engraver of the medal was Charles Anderson Ferrier of Dundee, a Fellow of the Linnean Society from 1882. On the obverse of the medal is the head of Linnaeus in profile and the words "Carolus Linnaeus", on the reverse are the arms of the society and the legend "Societas Linnaeana optime merenti"; an oval space is reserved for the recipient's name.

Linnean medallists

19th century
1888: Sir Joseph D. Hooker and Sir Richard Owen
1889: Alphonse Louis Pierre Pyrame de Candolle
1890: Thomas Henry Huxley
1891: Jean-Baptiste Édouard Bornet
1892: Alfred Russel Wallace
1893: Daniel Oliver
1894: Ernst Haeckel
1895: Ferdinand Julius Cohn
1896: George James Allman
1897: Jacob Georg Agardh
1898: George Charles Wallich
1899: John Gilbert Baker
1900: Alfred Newton

20th century
1901: Sir George King
1902: Albert von Kölliker
1903: Mordecai Cubitt Cooke
1904: Albert C. L. G. Günther
1905: Eduard Strasburger
1906: Alfred Merle Norman
1907: Melchior Treub
1908: Thomas Roscoe Rede Stebbing
1909: Frederick Orpen Bower
1910: Georg Ossian Sars
1911: Hermann Graf zu Solms-Laubach
1912: Robert Cyril Layton Perkins
1913: Heinrich Gustav Adolf Engler
1914: Otto Butschli
1915: Joseph Henry Maiden
1916: Frank Evers Beddard
1917: Henry Brougham Guppy
1918: Frederick DuCane Godman
1919: Sir Isaac Bayley Balfour
1920: Sir Edwin Ray Lankester
1921: Dukinfield Henry Scott
1922: Sir Edward Bagnall Poulton
1923: Thomas Frederic Cheeseman
1924: William Carmichael McIntosh
1925: Francis Wall Oliver
1926: Edgar Johnson Allen
1927: Otto Stapf
1928: Edmund Beecher Wilson
1929: Hugo de Vries
1930: James Peter Hill
1931: Karl Ritter von Goebel
1932: Edwin Stephen Goodrich
1933: Robert Hippolyte Chodat
1934: Sir Sidney Frederic Harmer
1935: Sir David Prain
1936: John Stanley Gardiner
1937: Frederick Frost Blackman
1938: Sir D'Arcy Wentworth Thompson
1939: Elmer Drew Merrill
1940: Sir Arthur Smith Woodward
1941: Sir Arthur George Tansley
1942: Award suspended
1946: William Thomas Calman and Frederick Ernest Weiss
1947: Maurice Jules Gaston Corneille Caullery
1948: Agnes Arber
1949: D. M. S. Watson
1950: Henry Nicholas Ridley
1951: Theodor Mortensen
1952: Isaac Henry Burkill
1953: Patrick Alfred Buxton
1954: Felix Eugene Fritsch
1955: Sir John Graham Kerr
1956: William Henry Lang
1957: Erik Stensiö
1958: Sir Gavin de Beer and William Bertram Turrill
1959: H. M. Fox and Carl Skottsberg
1960: Libbie H. Hyman and Hugh Hamshaw Thomas
1961:  and F. S. Russle [sic]
1962: Norman L. Bor and Guillermo Kuschel
1963: Sidnie M. Manton and William H. Pearsall
1964: Richard E. Holttum and Carl Frederick Abel Pantin 
1965: John Hutchinson and John Ramsbottom
1966: George Stuart Carter and Sir Harry Godwin
1967: Charles Sutherland Elton and Charles E. Hubbard
1968:  and T. M. Harris
1969: Irene Manton and Ethelwynn Trewavas
1970: E. J. H. Corner and Errol I. White
1971: Charles Russell Metcalfe and James Edward Smith
1972: Arthur Roy Clapham and Alfred Romer
1973: G. Ledyard Stebbins and John.Z.Young
1974: E. H. W. Hennig and Josias Braun-Blanquet
1975: A. S. Watt and Philip M Sheppard
1976: William Thomas Stearn
1977: Ernst Mayr and Thomas G. Tutin
1978:  and Thomas Stanley Westoll
1979: Robert McNeill Alexander and P. W. Richards
1980: Geoffrey Clough Ainsworth and Roy Crowson
1981: Brian Laurence Burtt and Sir Cyril Astley Clarke
1982: Peter Hadland Davis and Peter H. Greenwood
1983: Cecil T. Ingold and Michael J. D. White
1984: John G. Hawkes and J. S. Kennedy
1985: Arthur Cain and Jeffrey B. Harborne
1986: Arthur Cronquist and Percy C. C. Garnham
1987: Geoffrey Fryer and V. H. Heywood
1988: John L. Harley and Sir Richard Southwood
1989: William Donald Hamilton and Sir David Smith
1990: Sir Ghillean Tolmie Prance and F. Gwendolen Rees
1991: William Gilbert Chaloner and R. M. May
1992: Richard Evans Schultes and Stephen Jay Gould
1993: Barbara Pickersgill and Lincoln Brower
1994:  and Sir Alec John Jeffreys
1995: S. M. Walters and John Maynard Smith
1996: Jack Heslop-Harrison and Keith Vickerman
1997: Enrico S. Coen and Rosemary Helen Lowe-McConnell
1998: Mark W. Chase and C. Patterson
1999: Philip Barry Tomlinson and Quentin Bone
2000: Bernard Verdcourt and Michael F. Claridge

21st century
2001: Chris Humphries and 
2002: Sherwin Carlquist and 
2003: Pieter Baas and Bryan Campbell Clarke
2004: Geoffrey Allen Boxshall and John Dransfield
2005: Paula Rudall and 
2006: David Mabberley and Richard A. Fortey
2007:  and Thomas Cavalier-Smith
2008:  and Stephen Donovan
2009: Peter Shaw Ashton and Michael Akam
2010: Dianne Edwards and Derek Yalden
2011: Brian J. Coppins and H. Charles Godfray
2012: Stephen Blackmore and Peter Holland
2013: Kingsley Wayne Dixon
2014:  and 
2016: Sandra Knapp and Georgina Mace
2017:  and 
2018: Kamaljit S Bawa, and Sophien Kamoun
2019: Vicki Funk and 
2020: Ben Sheldon
2022: Rohan Pethiyagoda

See also

 List of biology awards

References

Biology awards
Linnean Society of London
British science and technology awards
Commemoration of Carl Linnaeus
Awards established in 1888
1888 establishments in the United Kingdom